Vladimir Klavdiyevich Arsenyev,  (10 September 1872 – 4 September 1930) was a Russian explorer of the Far East who recounted his travels in a series of books — "По Уссурийскому Краю" ("Along the Ussuri land") (1921) and "Дерсу Узала" ("Dersu Uzala") (1923) — telling of his military journeys to the Ussuri basin with Dersu Uzala, a native hunter, from 1902 to 1907. He was the first to describe numerous species of Siberian flora and the lifestyles of native ethnic peoples.

Early life

Arseniev was born in St. Petersburg, Russian Empire. His father, born a serf, became the chief of the Moscow District Railway. After a military education, Arseniev began his expeditions to the forests of the Far East. He lived in  Vladivostok through the years of the Russian Civil War and was a Commissar for Ethnic Minorities (Komissar po delam inorodcheskim) of the independent Far Eastern Republic. After the Far Eastern Republic was absorbed by Soviet Russia in 1922 Arsenyev refused to emigrate and stayed in Vladivostok.

Work

Arseniev is most famous for authoring many books about his explorations, including some 60 works on the geography, wildlife and ethnography of the regions he traveled. Arseniev's most famous book, Dersu Uzala, is a memoir of three expeditions in the Ussurian taiga (forest) of Northern Asia along the Sea of Japan and North to Vladivostok. The book is named after Arseniev's guide, an Ussurian native of the Goldi tribe (referred to as the Nanai people today). Eventually the book was made into two films, one by Soviet director Agasi Babayan in 1961, the other by Japanese filmmaker Akira Kurosawa in 1975. Kurosawa's Dersu Uzala won that year's Oscar for Best Foreign-Language Film. The third book of Arsenyev's trilogy, In the Sikhote-Alin mountains, was published posthumously in 1937.

Arsenyev's books have been translated into multiple languages including English, German, French, Spanish, Japanese, and more. The "Dersu Uzala trilogy" was first translated in 1924 into German as a two-volume set (In der Wildnis Ostsibiriens). More recently, in 2016 an uncensored, annotated edition of 1921's Across the Ussuri Kray was translated to English.

Personal life
Arseniev died in 1930 in Vladivostok at the age of 57. His widow, Margarita Nikolaevna Arsenieva, was arrested in 1934 and again in 1937 after being accused of being a member of an underground organization of spies and saboteurs allegedly headed by her late husband. The military court hearing of the case (21 August 1938) lasted ten minutes and sentenced her to death. She was executed immediately. Arsenyev's daughter Natalya also was arrested in April 1941 and sentenced to the Gulag.

Legacy
Arsenyev’s family home in Vladivostok has been made into a museum. Arsenyev, a town located in Primorsky Krai, was named after him. In 2018 Vladivostok International Airport was renamed after him.

Works
"По Уссурийскому краю (Дерсу Узала). Путешествие в горную область "Сихотэ-Алинь" (Po Ussuriyskomu Krayu) (Vladivostok 1921), the first book of Dersu Uzala trilogy.
"Дерсу Узала Из воспоминаний о путешествиях по Уссурийскому краю в 1907 г. Владивосток" (Dersu Uzala)  (1923).
"Dersu Uzala" translated by Malcolm Burr as "Dersu the trapper." Kingston, N.Y.: McPherson & Company, 1996. 
"В горах Сихотэ-Алиня" (In the Sikhote-Alin Mountains), the third book of the Dersu-Uzala trilogy, published posthumously in 1937 
"Мифы, легенды, предания и сказки народов Дальнего Востока" (Mify, legendy, predaniya i skazki narodov Dal'nego Vostoka) (Myths, legends, traditions, and fables of peoples of Far East).  Monograph Series, International Institute of Ethnolinguistic and Oriental Studies (IIEOS),  ; 10,

References

External links
 Article about Vladimir Arsenyev

1872 births
1930 deaths
Writers from Saint Petersburg
People from Sankt-Peterburgsky Uyezd
Imperial Russian Army officers
Russian travel writers
Russian explorers
Explorers of Siberia
Primorsky Krai
Fellows of the Royal Geographical Society
Recipients of the Order of St. Vladimir, 4th class
Recipients of the Order of St. Anna, 3rd class
Recipients of the Order of St. Anna, 4th class
Recipients of the Order of Saint Stanislaus (Russian), 2nd class
Recipients of the Order of Saint Stanislaus (Russian), 3rd class
Russian people of the Boxer Rebellion
Russian people of the Russo-Japanese War